Stephen E. Pugh (April 1, 1961 – September 7, 2021) was an American florist and politician. He served as a member of the Louisiana House of Representatives from 2008 until January 2020 as a member of the Republican Party.

Pugh, a professional florist, was a resident of Ponchatoula, Louisiana. He died on September 7, 2021, at the age of 60.

References

1961 births
2021 deaths
Republican Party members of the Louisiana House of Representatives
Florists
People from Ponchatoula, Louisiana